Chilton Moor is a village in Tyne and Wear, England. The village is located between Houghton le Spring and Fence Houses on the Tyne and Wear/County Durham county boundary.

References

Villages in Tyne and Wear
Villages in County Durham